German World War II camouflage patterns formed a family of disruptively patterned military camouflage designs for clothing, used and in the main designed during the Second World War. The first pattern, Splittertarnmuster ("splinter camouflage pattern"), was designed in 1931 and was initially intended for Zeltbahn shelter halves. The clothing patterns developed from it combined a pattern of interlocking irregular green, brown, and buff polygons with vertical "rain" streaks. Later patterns, all said to have been designed for the Waffen-SS by Johann Georg Otto Schick, evolved into more leaf-like forms with rounded dots or irregular shapes. Camouflage smocks were designed to be reversible, providing camouflage for two seasons, whether summer and autumn, or summer and winter (snow). Distribution was limited to the Waffen-SS, ostensibly because of a patent, though variants were used by other units, including the Luftwaffe. Production was limited by shortage of materials, especially of high quality waterproof cotton duck. 

The Reichswehr (Army of the Weimar Republic) started experimenting with camouflage patterns for Wehrmacht uniforms before World War II and some army units used Splittertarnmuster ("splinter camouflage pattern"), first issued in 1931, and based on Zeltbahn shelter halves/groundsheets. Waffen-SS combat units used various patterns from 1935 onwards. The SS camouflage patterns were designed by Johann Georg Otto Schick, a Munich art professor and then the director of the German camouflage research unit, at the request of an SS Major, Wim Brandt. Brandt was an engineer and the commander of the SS-VT reconnaissance battalion, and he was looking for better camouflage. Schick had researched the effect of light on trees in summer and in autumn. These led to the idea of reversible camouflage clothing, with green summer patterns on one side, brown autumn patterns on the other. In 1937, the patterns were field tested by the SS-VT Deutschland regiment, resulting in an estimate that they would cut casualties by fifteen percent. In 1938, a reversible spring/autumn helmet cover, smock, and sniper's face mask in Schick's forest patterns on waterproof cotton duck were patented for the Waffen-SS. The patent is said to have prevented the Wehrmacht from using the patterns, which became a distinctive emblem of the Waffen-SS during the war. However, patterned uniforms were worn by some other units, including from 1941 the Luftwaffe, which had its own version of Splittertarnmuster, as well as the Kriegsmarine (navy), the Fallschirmjäger (paratroops), and the Waffen-SS. The 1945 Leibermuster was planned to be issued to both the SS and the Wehrmacht, but it appeared too late to be widely distributed.

Production of groundsheets, helmet covers and smocks by the Warei, Forster and Joring companies began in November 1938. They were initially hand-printed, limiting deliveries by January 1939 to only 8,400 groundsheets and 6,800 helmet covers and a small number of smocks. By June 1940, machine printing had taken over, and 33,000 smocks were made for the Waffen-SS. Supplies of high quality cotton duck, however, remained critically short throughout the war, and essentially ran out in January 1943. It was replaced by non-waterproof cotton drill cloth.

Patterns 

The German names used for the plane tree, palm and oak leaf patterns are not those that were used in the German armed forces, but were invented by postwar collectors of militaria.

See also 
 Digital camouflage
 Flecktarn – post-World War II camouflage pattern used by the Bundeswehr

Notes

References

Sources 
 
 
 
 
   
 
 
  Reprinted in: Borsarello, J.F. (Ed.) (1990). SS & Wehrmacht Camouflage, ISO Publications.

Further reading

External links 
 Germany - pre-1945 on Camopedia, illustrated
 Introduction to German World War 2 Patterns by Michael Farnworth, illustrated with photographs of patterns and equipment

German military uniforms
Military camouflage